Bahram Khan was the governor of Sonargaon, East Bengal (now Bangladesh), from 1328 until 1337. He was a general of Delhi Sultanate. He was also appointed the governor of Satgaon during 1324–1328.

Sonargaon ruler 
Khan contributed to the rise of Tughlaq domination in Bengal. In 1324, Khan took part in the expedition of Ghiyasuddin Tughlaq to conquer Trihut and Bengal. At that time he was the ruler of Zafarabad near Jaunpur. He led campaigns against the rulers of Lakhnauti and Sonargaon. Khan expelled Bahadur Shah from Lakhnauti. Later Bahadur Shah was captured while fleeing.  % BE% E0% A6% A4% E0% A6% BE% E0% A6% B0_% E0% A6% 96% E0% A6% BE% E0% A6% A8 | Title = Tatar Khan - Banglapedia | Website = bn. banglapedia.org | Collection-Date = 2021-02-20} 

Before returning to Delhi, Ghiyasuddin Tughlaq appointed Khan as the ruler of Sonargaon and Satgaon. Bahadur Shah was liberated in 1325 by the next sultan Muhammad bin Tughlaq and was appointed ruler of Sonargaon. At the same time Khan was appointed as the representative of the Sultan. 

Bahadur Shah declared independence in 1326. He also introduced coins in his own name. Then Bahadur Shah was defeated and killed in a battle with Khan. Khan was conferred the title of "Khan-i-Azam Bahram Khan" by Sultan Muhammad bin Tughlaq of Delhi for his contribution to the establishment of Tughlaq rule in Bengal. 

Khan was appointed governor of Sonargaon in 1326.

Contribution to the study of knowledge 
Khan has provided patronage in the pursuit of knowledge. He collected many commentaries on the Qur'an and compiled Tafsir-i-Tatarkhani with the help of Alem in Sonargaon. He has sponsored the compilation. 

Faqih Kamal-i-Karim wrote a book on Fiqh in Arabic called "Majmu-i-Khani fi Ain Al-Maani". He dedicated this book in the name of Ulug Kutlug Aizjuddin Bahram Khan, the ruler of Bengal. This Bahram Khan and Khan are the same person.

Death 
Khan Sonargaon died in 1338. His armor keeper Fakhruddin Mubarak Shah then declared himself the independent sultan of Sonargaon.

See also
 List of rulers of Bengal
 Rulers of Bengal
 Sonargaon

References

Delhi Sultanate
Governors of Bengal
People from Sonargaon Upazila